Essentials of Hindutva is an ideological epigraph by  Vinayak Damodar Savarkar published in 1923. It was retitled Hindutva: Who Is a Hindu? (with the second phrase as a subtitle) when reprinted in 1928. Savarkar's epigraph forms part of the canon of works published during British rule that later influenced post-independence contemporary Hindu nationalism.

Themes
Savarkar used the term "Hindutva" (Sanskrit -tva, neuter abstract suffix) to describe "Hinduness" or the "quality of being a Hindu". Savarkar regarded Hinduism as an ethnic, cultural and political identity. Hindus, according to Savarkar, are those who consider India to be the land in which their ancestors lived, as well as the land in which their religion originated: "one for whom India is both Fatherland and Holyland".

Sarvakar includes all Indian religions in the term "Hinduism" and outlines his vision of a "Hindu Rashtra" (Hindu Nation) as "Akhand Bharat" (Undivided India), stretching across the entire Indian subcontinent.
 
"We Hindus are bound together not only by the tie of the love we bear to a common fatherland and by the common blood that courses through our veins and keeps our hearts throbbing and our affections warm, but also by the tie of the common homage we pay to our great civilization - our Hindu culture" Fifth Edition 1969 p91 (Internet Archive PDF p108)

Savarkar wrote the pamphlet while imprisoned for his alleged role in the assassination of William Hutt Curzon Wyllie.

References

Bibliography

External links

 Essentials of Hindutva, First Edition, 1923, publisher: V. V. Kalkar, Nagapur. Via archive.org
 Hindutva (Who Is A Hindu?), Fifth Edition, Veer Savarkar Prakashan, 1969. Via archive.org
 Essentials of Hindutva, Unknown edition, digital text via savarkar.org

1923 non-fiction books
Hindutva
Hinduism studies books
Pamphlets
Vinayak Damodar Savarkar